Ben Muman, Gaelic-Irish female given name.

Bearers of the name

 Ben Muman ingen meic Congaile, died 1058.
 Ben Muman Ní Cathan, died 1283. 
 Ben Muman Ní Conchobair, died 1406.
 Ben Muman Bean Uí Donnchaidh, died 1411. 
 Ben Muman Ní Chonchobair, died 1411.
 Ben Muman Ní Diarmata, died 1436.
 Ben Muman Ní Dhorchaidh, died 1441.
 Ben Muman Ní Flannagain, died 1464.
 Ben Muman Bean Uí Cellaigh, died 1468.
 Ben Muman Óge Ní Duibhgeannáin, died 1599.

See also
 Bjaðmunjo Mýrjartaksdóttir, also known as Ben Muman

External links
 http://medievalscotland.org/kmo/AnnalsIndex/Feminine/BenMuman.shtml

Irish-language feminine given names